Muhandes meaning "engineer" in Arabic and its variants like Muhandis, Mohandes, Mohandis etc. may refer to:

Abu Mahdi al-Muhandis (1954–2020), Iraqi politician and military commander
Majid al-Muhandis or al-Muhandes (born 1971), Iraqi singer and composer
Mohammed Mohandis or Mo Muhandes (born 1985), Moroccan-Dutch politician

See also
Mohandessin, an area in Agouza, Giza, Egypt
Alamabad-e Mohandes, a village in Khuzesran Province, Iran
Al Muhandis, the nickname of the Palestinian bombmaker Yahya Ayash (1966–1996)
Mohandas (disambiguation)